Llanelli is a town in Wales.

Llanelli may also refer to:

Places
 Llanelli (UK Parliament constituency), a constituency of the House of Commons of the Parliament of the United Kingdom
 Llanelli (Senedd constituency), a constituency of the Senedd
 Llanelli Rural, a community in Carmarthenshire, Wales
 Llanelli (district), a former local government district in Wales

Other
 Llanelli RFC, the Welsh town's rugby union club, now feeder to and owner of the Scarlets regional side
 Llanelli A.F.C., a former Welsh football club

See also
 Llanelly, a village and its respective parish